G. Elangovan is an Indian politician and former Member of the Legislative Assembly of Tamil Nadu. He was elected to the Tamil Nadu legislative assembly as a Dravida Munnetra Kazhagam candidate from Tiruvaiyaru constituency in 1971, and 1977 elections.

References 

Living people
Dravida Munnetra Kazhagam politicians
Year of birth missing (living people)